Aphthona melancholica is a species of leaf beetles in the subfamily Galerucinae. It is found on the Iberian Peninsula and in England. Adult beetles and their larvae feed on leaves of Euphorbia species (Euphorbiaceae).

References

External links

Alticini
Beetles described in 1888
Beetles of Europe
Taxa named by Julius Weise